Dräger or Draeger is a German surname that may refer to
Alexander Bernhard Dräger (1870–1928), German engineer, industrialist and inventor
Andreas Dräger (born 1980), German bioinformatician and systems biologist
Anton Josef Dräger (1794–1833), German painter
Christoph Draeger (born 1965), Swiss multimedia artist
Donn F. Draeger (1922–1982), American teacher and practitioner of Japanese martial arts
Guus Dräger (1917–1989), Dutch association football player
Lothar Dräger (1927–2016), German comic writer
Marie-Louise Dräger (born 1981), German rower 
Richard Draeger (born 1937), American rower 

German-language surnames